Westendstraße is an U-Bahn station in Munich on the U4 and U5 line of the Munich U-Bahn system. This is now at certain times the terminus of the U4, since its route was shortened from terminating at Laimer Platz. In rush hour and in general during the holidays it already ends at the Theresienwiese, in the evenings at the Odeonsplatz.

See also
List of Munich U-Bahn stations

References

Munich U-Bahn stations
Railway stations in Germany opened in 1984
1984 establishments in West Germany